Viburnum odoratissimum, commonly known as sweet viburnum, is a shrub or small tree in the family Adoxaceae. It is native to Asia, and commonly cultivated as a garden ornamental elsewhere.

Description

It grows to 9 metres high and has glossy elliptical leaves to 20 cm long. In spring it produces pyramid-shaped clusters of fragrant white flowers, followed by red berries that age to black.

Distribution and habitat
The species is native to China, Korea, Taiwan, Japan, the Himalayan region in India, Myanmar, Thailand, Vietnam and the Philippines.

V. odoratissimum var. awabuki is native to Korea (Jeju Island), Taiwan, and Japan.

Cultivation
The species prefers warm, frost-free climates.

References

odoratissimum
Garden plants
Flora of China
Flora of Assam (region)
Flora of Japan
Flora of Myanmar
Flora of the Philippines
Flora of Thailand
Flora of Taiwan